Viktor Viktorovich Bolikhov (born 1 December 1983) is a Russian former professional footballer.

Club career
He made his debut in the Russian Premier League in 2002 for FC Torpedo Moscow.

References

1983 births
Living people
People from Tver Oblast
Russian footballers
Russia under-21 international footballers
Association football midfielders
FC Torpedo Moscow players
FC Anzhi Makhachkala players
Russian Premier League players
FC Znamya Truda Orekhovo-Zuyevo players
Sportspeople from Tver Oblast